Selefougou is a small town and commune in the Cercle of Kangaba in the Koulikoro Region of south-western Mali. As of 1998 the commune had a population of 4102.

References

Communes of Koulikoro Region